Zuck is an extinct town in Knox County, in the U.S. state of Ohio. The GNIS classifies it as a populated place.

History
A post office called Zuck was established in 1880, and remained in operation until 1903. The community was named for Stephen Zuck, the owner of a mill.

References

Unincorporated communities in Knox County, Ohio
1880 establishments in Ohio
Populated places established in 1880
Unincorporated communities in Ohio